The last rites, in Catholicism, are the last prayers and ministrations given to many Catholics when possible shortly before death.

Last rites may also refer to:
Antyesti, in Hinduism
Islamic funeral, in Islam
Viduy, in the Jewish faith

Last Rites may also refer to:

 Last Rites (computer game), a 1997 game by Ocean Software
 Last Rites (1988 film), a 1988 film starring Tom Berenger
 Last Rites (1975 film), a 1975 Australian comedy film
 Last Rites (1998 film), a TV film starring Randy Quaid
 "Last Rites" (Law & Order: Criminal Intent), an episode of Law & Order: Criminal Intent
 "Last Rites" (Once Upon a Time), a fifth-season episode of the series
 Last Rites (band), an English goth-industrial band
 "Last Rites/Loved to Death", a song by Megadeth from Killing Is My Business... and Business Is Good!
 Last Rites (album), a 2011 album by doom metal band Pentagram

See also
 Last Rights (disambiguation)